Michael V Vitiello is an American researcher, academic and professor. He is Professor of Psychiatry and Behavioral Sciences at University of Washington. He is the Editor-in-Chief of Sleep Medicine Reviews as well as the Adjunct Professor of Gerontology and Geriatric Medicine, Adjunct Professor of Biobehavioral Nursing and Health Systems, and Co-Director of the Northwest Geriatrics Workforce Enhancement Center (NW GWEC), University of Washington.

References 

Living people
Year of birth missing (living people)
Fellows of the Gerontological Society of America
University of Washington faculty
University of Washington alumni
Columbia College (New York) alumni
Scientists from Brooklyn
Medical journal editors